Eastchester  may refer to:
 Eastchester (town), New York
 Eastchester, Bronx
 Eastchester (CDP), New York
 Eastchester High School
 Eastchester Bay
 East Chester, near Chester, Nova Scotia
 Eastchester Historical Society
 Eastchester Depot
 Eastchester–Dyre Avenue (IRT Dyre Avenue Line)
 East Chesterton